Katherine Nataly Arias Peña (born 2 April 1986) is a Colombian international footballer who currently plays as a center back.  She represented Colombia at the 2011 FIFA Women's World Cup in Germany, 2012 Summer Olympics in London and 2015 FIFA Women's World Cup in Canada as well as the 2016 Summer Olympics in Brazil.

References

External links 
 

1986 births
Living people
Colombian women's footballers
Olympic footballers of Colombia
Footballers at the 2012 Summer Olympics
Footballers at the 2016 Summer Olympics
2011 FIFA Women's World Cup players
2015 FIFA Women's World Cup players
Women's association football defenders
Colombia women's international footballers
Maryland Terrapins women's soccer players
Sportspeople from Arlington County, Virginia
Soccer players from Virginia
American women's soccer players
Footballers at the 2015 Pan American Games
American sportspeople of Colombian descent
American sportspeople of Venezuelan descent
People with acquired Colombian citizenship
Atlanta Silverbacks Women players
Pan American Games competitors for Colombia
Pan American Games silver medalists for Colombia
Pan American Games medalists in football
Medalists at the 2015 Pan American Games
21st-century Colombian women